Guðrøðarson or Gudrödarson may refer to:

Halfdan Gudrödarson or Halfdan the Black, (9th century?) king of Vestfold
Haraldr Guðrøðarson, mid thirteenth-century King of the Isles
Lǫgmaðr Guðrøðarson, late eleventh-century King of the Isles
Ólafr Guðrøðarson (died 941), Irish-Viking leader who ruled Dublin and Viking Northumbria
Óláfr Guðrøðarson (died 1153), twelfth-century King of Mann and the Isles
Óláfr Guðrøðarson (died 1237) or Olaf the Black, King of the Isles, member of the Crovan dynasty
Rǫgnvaldr Guðrøðarson (died 1229), ruled as King of the Isles from 1187 to 1226